Baddi University of Emerging Sciences and Technology (BUEST), formerly the Institute of Engineering and Emerging Technology (IEET), commonly referred to as Baddi University, is a private university located at Baddi, Himachal Pradesh, India. It was  recognized as a university in 2009.

Campus
BUEST is situated in the foothills of the Himalayas in the industrial areas of Baddi, 40 km away from Chandigarh via Pinjore, 29 km from Chandigarh via siswan; 30 km from Panchkula and 20 km from Pinjore.

The institute campus is situated in the Solan district of Himachal Pradesh, India.
In Baddi University there are hostels for both Boys & Girls. Girls Hostels are situated inside the campus which is adjacent to Pharmacy department while Boys Hostel of 1st-year students is just at a walking distance of 5 minutes from MBA Department and senior Boys Hostel is located outside of the campus.

Institutes
The university incorporates four institutes:

School of Engineering and Emerging Technologies (SEET)
SEET was formerly known as IEET.

IEET was first institute established in year 2002. It offers undergraduate, postgraduate level studies and research in engineering.
IEET has 8 academic departments.

School of Pharmacy and Emerging Sciences (SPES) 
School of Pharmacy and Emerging Sciences (SPES) was established in year 2007.
It is a well known college in India ranked no. 1 by AICTE.

School of Management Studies (IMS) 
School of Management Studies (IMS) was established in year 2008.

School of Agriculture Sciences (SOAS) 
SOAS offers degree in B.Sc.Agriculture.

Student life

Facilities

Library
In Baddi University there are Libraries for MBA, Engineering, Pharmacy departments.

Sports
Baddi University provides sports facilities for indoor and outdoor games. Sports facilities include cricket, football, volleyball, table tennis, badminton and athletics.

Events
Cultural activities like dramatics, speaking, Literary Arts, Music and Fine Arts also mark an important feature in the life of a student of Baddi University. Speaking and Literary Arts have always been very popular in the student community with students actively participating in quizzing, writing and debating activities.

Sangam
Sangam is the annual fresher party held every year in the month of September–October.

Emanation
Emanation is an annual two-day function usually organized in the month of March/April. It consists of cultural nights, annual prize distribution, technical events and soft skill events along with fun events. Jay z B, Barbie Rajput, and The local Train were present for the 2014 Emanation.

MasterMind
MasterMind was a himachal oriented mega competition which aimed to search for one young genius who has achieved high level of intelligence, creativity, talent, communication skills, technical capability, general knowledge. The 1st MasterMind winner -Mohammad Saad from kullu District won the 2013 MasterMind title with 1 lakh cash prize and Scholarship

Societies and clubs

 SSB Club
 National Service Scheme(NSS) Unit
 Sports
 Art of Living
 ISTE Chapters
 Music and Dramatics Society
 Literary Society
 Fine Arts Society
 Hackers Club
 Corporate Social Responsibility Club
 Robotics Club

References

External links 
 

Engineering colleges in Himachal Pradesh
Education in Solan district
Educational institutions established in 2002
2002 establishments in Himachal Pradesh